Yucca Army Airfield is a former military airfield located about  west of Yucca, in Mohave County, Arizona, United States. It is now used as a private facility owned by Fiat Chrysler Automobiles named Chrysler Arizona Proving Grounds.

Military use
In 1943–44, the US Army Air Forces acquired  to build a satellite airfield for the use of Kingman AAF and its gunnery school. Activated on 1 December 1941, the facility consisted of two 6,000' asphalt runways, taxiways, control tower, 45 buildings, roads, a railroad spur, electrical utilities, water utilities, and a sewage disposal plant.

Yucca AAF was commanded by the 3019th Army Air Force Base Unit, part of the AAF's 36th Flying Training Wing, Western Flying Training Command. It was primarily a flexible gunnery school, with the adjoining Yucca Air to Air Gunnery Range being located to the southwest. Bell P-39 and P-63 fighters were used as gunnery targets at Yucca Aux AAF. B-26 bombers were also used as target tugs at Yucca AAF.

In addition to the main base, the adjoining Yucca Air to Air Gunnery Range was located to the southwest of Yucca AAF. It consisted of a total of 550,000 acres, and the range had four airfields. The civil Port Kingman Airport was also utilized as an auxiliary landing field:
 Cyclopic Army Auxiliary Airfield #1  
 Hackberry Army Auxiliary Airfield #3 
 Topock Army Auxiliary Airfield #5  
 Lake Havasu Auxiliary Army Airfield #6 
 Signal Auxiliary Army Airfield #7 
 Port Kingman Airport 

Yucca AAF was closed and turned over to the Army Division Engineers on 23 December 1945. It was declared surplus in 1946 and responsibility for it was given to the War Assets Administration.

Civil use
In 1954 the Packard Motor Company acquired the airport facility and began using the runways for automobile testing. Ford eventually built an extensive automotive proving ground surrounding the airfield.

As of 2002, the airfield itself was still operated by Ford as a private airfield, known as the Arizona Proving Ground Airport. Ford also continued to use some of the original military facilities, including the control tower, runways, taxiways, and parking aprons. However, all of the original military buildings (except for the control tower) had been removed.

The Yucca airfield was evidently closed by Ford at some point between 2002 and 2006. As of 2018 the airport is listed as an abandoned paved runway.

In 2007 the airfield was sold to Chrysler, which now operates the Chrysler Arizona Proving Grounds at this location. Harley-Davidson Motor Company has entered into an agreement to use the vehicle test facility to test their motorcycles. Harley-Davidson occupies several buildings at the test facility, including at least one they custom built.

The USAAF technical site is now being used by buildings as part of the proving ground. The only wartime structure evident in aerial photos of the facility is the air traffic control tower. The wartime runways and taxiways are still in use.

See also

 Chrysler Arizona Proving Grounds
 Arizona World War II Army Airfields

References

 Manning, Thomas A. (2005), History of Air Education and Training Command, 1942–2002.  Office of History and Research, Headquarters, AETC, Randolph AFB, Texas  
 Shaw, Frederick J. (2004), Locating Air Force Base Sites, History’s Legacy, Air Force History and Museums Program, United States Air Force, Washington DC. 
 Thole, Lou (1999), Forgotten Fields of America : World War II Bases and Training, Then and Now – Vol. 2.  Publisher: Pictorial Histories Pub, 

1941 establishments in Arizona
Military installations established in 1941
Military installations closed in 1946
Airfields of the United States Army Air Forces in Arizona
Airports in Mohave County, Arizona
1946 disestablishments in Arizona